Capocorb Vell is a talayotic site located about 12 km from Llucmajor on the island of Mallorca. It is one of the most highly excavated talayotic sites in the Balearic islands. Another such site is  Ses Païsses.

There are a number of talayots to the North-East of the main site, which is reminiscent of the (accidental or intentional) South-West to North-East alignment of Son Oleza.

References

Bibliography

External links 
 Website for Capocorb Vell
 Capocorb Vell on German Wikipedia
 Capocorb Vell on Megalithic.co.uk

Archaeological sites in the Balearic Islands
Prehistoric sites in Spain
Megalithic monuments in Spain
Bronze Age Spain
Former populated places in Spain
Prehistory of the Balearic Islands
Buildings and structures in Mallorca